Karlo Pavlenć (9 January 1926 – 11 August 1987) was a Croatian rower. He competed at the 1948 Summer Olympics and the 1952 Summer Olympics.

References

1926 births
1987 deaths
Croatian male rowers
Olympic rowers of Yugoslavia
Rowers at the 1948 Summer Olympics
Rowers at the 1952 Summer Olympics
Sportspeople from Zagreb
20th-century Croatian people